Ignacio Lucas Varela (born 20 July 1990) is an Argentine football player. He also holds Italian citizenship. He plays in Italian Serie D, with the sicilian team Ragusa Calcio.

Club career
He made his Primera B Nacional debut for Ferro Carril Oeste on 16 April 2011 in a game against CAI.

In December 2019, Varela joined Serie D club F.C. Vado.

References

External links
 

1990 births
Footballers from Buenos Aires
Living people
Argentine footballers
Argentine expatriate footballers
Ferro Carril Oeste footballers
Club Atlético Colegiales (Argentina) players
Sarmiento de Resistencia footballers
Asociación Social y Deportiva Justo José de Urquiza players
Llaneros F.C. players
A.S.D. HSL Derthona players
NK Istra 1961 players
Floriana F.C. players
Sliema Wanderers F.C. players
F.C. Vado players
Primera Nacional players
Primera B Metropolitana players
Categoría Primera B players
Serie D players
Croatian Football League players
Maltese Premier League players
Argentine expatriate sportspeople in Colombia
Argentine expatriate sportspeople in Croatia
Argentine expatriate sportspeople in Malta
Argentine expatriate sportspeople in Italy
Expatriate footballers in Colombia
Expatriate footballers in Croatia
Expatriate footballers in Malta
Expatriate footballers in Italy
Association football forwards